Paulo Gonçalves (born 18 November 1936) is a Brazilian football manager.

Career
Gonçalves was the head coach of the Brazil women's national team at the 2003 FIFA Women's World Cup.

References

External links
 
 
 Paulo Gonçalves at Soccerdonna.de 

1936 births
Living people
Brazilian football managers
Women's association football managers
Brazil women's national football team managers
2003 FIFA Women's World Cup managers